The State of the Republic of Indonesia (old spelling:) was a federated state  of the United States of Indonesia (RUSI) which was established on 27 December 1949. The territory of the state included parts of Java and most of Sumatra, and its capital was Yogyakarta.  The acting president of the Republic was Assaat (Sukarno became president of the RUSI) and the prime minister was first Susanto Tirtoprodjo until 16 January 1950, then Abdul Halim.  On 17 August, the United States of Indonesia ceased to exist as the last of the component states dissolved themselves into a unitary Republic of Indonesia encompassing the entire territory of the former Dutch East Indies except for West Papua.

President
Assaat Datuk Mudo was the only president of this Yogyakarta-based republic

See also

History of Indonesia
Indonesian National Revolution
Indonesian regions

Notes

References

 

Indonesian National Revolution
States and territories established in 1949
States and territories disestablished in 1950
Indonesia (1949-1950)
1949 establishments in Indonesia
1950 disestablishments in Indonesia